The 2002 Prague summit was a NATO summit held at the Prague Congress Centre where the heads of state and government of the NATO member states met. Seven states were at this summit invited to begin accession talks with NATO: Bulgaria, Estonia, Latvia, Lithuania, Romania, Slovakia and Slovenia. NATO's post-Cold War Open Door Policy was also reaffirmed at this meeting. A NATO Response Force was considered and planned at this moment, a force which would be officially declared ready at the 2006 Riga summit.

At a press conference, then-President of the United States George W. Bush declared to "disarm" Saddam Hussein together with a "coalition of the willing".

References

Summit of 2002
2002 Prague summit
2002 in politics
Diplomatic conferences in the Czech Republic
21st-century diplomatic conferences (NATO)
2002 in international relations
2002 conferences
2002 in the Czech Republic
2000s in Prague
Czech Republic and NATO
November 2002 events in Europe